Petronas Tower 3, also known as Carigali Tower, is a 60-story, 267-meter-tall skyscraper in KLCC, Kuala Lumpur, Malaysia. It is Malaysia's eighth tallest building and it is also part of the Petronas Towers complex. The 246-meter high building also features a 21-meter high crown-like structure on the top of the tower, making it 267-meter high. The building features a 6-level extension to the Suria KLCC shopping mall, while the rest of the floors above are solely made up of office spaces. It is the headquarters of Petronas Carigali, the E&P subsidiary of Petronas and some of the local subsidiaries of Multinational Corporations such as Microsoft Malaysia. Along with the Kuala Lumpur Convention Centre and the Binjai On The Park condominiums, the development of Lot C falls under Phase 2 of the KLCC project. Its development cost is reported at RM1 billion.

The Marini’s on 57 is located on the 57th floor of the building. It has a dedicated private lift that takes visitors directly to the rooftop bar and restaurant.

Construction
Construction started in late 2006 and completed in 2012. In January 2011, KLCC Properties Holdings Berhad (KLCCP) awarded an RM665mil contract for the superstructure to Daewoo Engineering and Construction, which began building the top structure in March 2009.
The retail mall section is expected to be ready by 2010, followed by the office block component by October 2011. The office tower will house  net lettable office space, while the retail portion of the building will measure . The development will also feature a tunnel link to the adjacent Lot D1, KLCC for future development.

See also
 Petronas Towers
 List of tallest buildings in Kuala Lumpur

References

External links
 KLCC official website
 KLCC Lot C on Emporis

César Pelli buildings
Modernist architecture in Malaysia
Skyscraper office buildings in Kuala Lumpur
2012 establishments in Malaysia
Office buildings completed in 2012